National Route 50 is a national highway of Japan connecting Maebashi, Gunma and Mito, Ibaraki.

Route data
Length: 144.2 km (89.6 mi).

History
Route 50 was designated on 18 May 1953 on the current route as National Route 122, and this was redesignated as Route 50 on 1 April 1963 when the route was promoted to a first-class highway.

References

050
Roads in Gunma Prefecture
Roads in Ibaraki Prefecture
Roads in Tochigi Prefecture